Stade de Reims Féminines or Stade de Reims Women is a French women's football club from Reims established in 1968 as FCF Reims . In 1970 it became Stade de Reims's women's team, and four years later it was one of the twelve founding teams of the Division 1 Féminine. They were the first French team to sign a player from Ireland in the contemporary era of women's football.

History 
Stade de Reims was one of the championship's leading teams during its first years, winning five titles between 1975 and 1982.

In 1973 Stade de Reims did a tour of Ireland and played a number of matches around the country. They played local teams and had one match against an Irish Selection. They signed Anne O'Brien afterwards making them the first non-Irish team to sign an Irish player, and they wanted to sign other players as well.

Some players did not sign because they were under 18 and their parents did not want them to move, and others were never told of the opportunity.

The team subsequently declined throughout the 1980s, but is currently playing in Division 1 Féminine (D1F).

Players

Current squad

Former players

  Colette Guyard
  Élisabeth Loisel
  Anne O'Brien
  Michèle Monier
  Rose Reilly
  Edna Neillis
  Tetyana Romanenko
   Marie-Christine Tschopp

Titles
 French Championship
Winners (5): 1975, 1976, 1977, 1980, 1982

References

External links
 

Reims
Association football clubs established in 1968
Stade de Reims
Division 1 Féminine clubs
1968 establishments in France
Reims Fem